Henry Heinz (1844–1919) is the founder of H. J. Heinz Company.

Henry Heinz may also refer to:
Jack Heinz (Henry John Heinz II, 1908–1987), former CEO of H. J. Heinz Company
John Heinz (Henry John Heinz III, 1938–1991), U.S. Senator from Pennsylvania
H. John Heinz IV (born 1966), eldest son of Senator John Heinz